Carol Lay (born 1952) is an American alternative cartoonist best known for her weekly comic strip, Story Minute (later to evolve into the strip Way Lay), which ran for almost 20 years in such US papers as the LA Weekly, the NY Press, and on Salon. Lay has been drawing professionally for over 30 years. Based in Los Angeles, Lay's strips and illustrations have appeared in  Entertainment Weekly, Mad,  Newsweek, Worth Magazine, The New York Times, The Wall Street Journal, and The New Yorker.

Biography

Early life 
Lay was born in Whittier, California. In 1975 she graduated with a B.F.A. in Fine Arts from UCLA.

Career 
After graduating from UCLA, Lay entered the comics industry at DC Comics and Western Publishing, while simultaneously writing and drawing underground comics for titles such as Weirdo and her own Good Girls #1–6.

Lay's work, including "Story Minute" appeared in alternative newsweeklies during the 1990s.

She is the author of Mythos, a prose novel featuring Wonder Woman (DC/Pocket Books, 2003), Goodnight, Irene: The Collected Stories of Irene Van de Kamp (Last Gasp, 2007), and The Big Skinny: How I Changed My Fattitude, a Memoir (Villard, 2008).

From 2010 to 2013, Lay wrote and drew Simpsons stories for Bongo Comics.

In 2013, Lay created Murderville #1: "A Farewell to Armories", a self-published, small-print-run, Kickstarter-funded comic featuring twenty-four pages of story plus four front & back, outside & inside cover pages.

On January 26, 2015, Carol Lay's Lay Lines page began on GoComics with a week-long serialization of her story "The Thing Under the Futon" (January 26–30, 2015), followed by serializations of "Now, Endsville" (February 3–10, 2015) and "Invisible City" (April 12–June 26, 2015).  Lay Lines has also reprinted pages from Lay's weekly newspaper comic Story Minutes, in color for the first time. New Lay Lines comics feature followups to Murderville.

Bibliography

 Wonder Woman: Mythos, Pocket Star, 2003. . (prose novel)
 Goodnight, Irene:  The Collected Stories of Irene Van de Kamp, Last Gasp, 2007.  . (collects the Irene Van de Camp stories from Good Girls plus a cover gallery and "About Face" (2006), a new 18-page story drawn for the collection)
 The Big Skinny:  How I Changed My Fattitude, A Memoir, Random House, 2008.  . (graphic novel/memoir/diet book, with recipes)

 Simpsons Comics Get Some Fancy Book Learnin''', Bongo Entertainment, 2010.  .  (5-page story, new for the collection, Lisa and Maggie Simpson in "Pandora, Jr.")CAROL LAY'S ILLITERATURE: STORY MINUTES Volume One, Boom! Town, 2012.  .  (Contains 103 STORY MINUTE strips from 1997 to 1999, plus an Introduction by Kim Deitch.)BART SIMPSON TO THE RESCUE, Harper, 2014.  .  (Includes reprints of Carol Lay's SIMPSONS stories "The Mystery of the Pesky Desk", "Fortunate Son", "A Tomb With a View", and "Pranks a Lot".)BART SIMPSON BLASTOFF, Harper, 2015.  .  (Includes reprints of Carol Lay's SIMPSONS stories "Sleepless in Springfield", "The Princess Principle", and "The Planet of the Plants".)SIMPSONS COMIC CLUBHOUSE, Harper, 2015, .  (Includes reprints of Carol Lay's SIMPSONS stories "Dirty Laundry", and "Fur 'n' Hate 451".)

References

External links

 

 Interviews 
 Scene Missing Magazine (Nov. 2004)
 Comics Journal (June 1999) (Contains two interviews with Carol Lay.   The first, with Kent Worcester, covers her early biography, influences, and stylistic development.  The second, with Kim Deitch, with whom she worked on the comic adaptation of the film Eating Raoul'', is more personal.)

1952 births
Living people
American comic strip cartoonists
American female comics artists
American satirists
American parodists
People from Whittier, California
University of California, Los Angeles alumni
Inkpot Award winners